Thammudu is a 1999 Indian Telugu-language sports action film written and directed by P. A. Arun Prasad.  The films stars Pawan Kalyan, Preeti Jhangiani, and Aditi Govitrikar. Bhupinder Singh, Achyuth, Brahmanandam, Ali, and Kitty play supporting roles. Thammudu was produced by Burugupalli Sivaramakrishna under the Sri Venkateswara Art Films banner. The music is composed by Ramana Gogula with cinematography by Madhu Ambat and editing by Marthand K. Venkatesh.

The film released on 15 July 1999 and went on to become a commercial success with the film's soundtrack by Ramana Gogula becoming a trendsetter. Thammudu was inspired from the 1979 American film, Breaking Away, as well as Aamir Khan's Jo Jeeta Wohi Sikander. The film was remade in Tamil as Badri (2001), in Kannada as Yuvaraja (2001) and in Bengali as Champion (2003).

Plot

Subrahmanyam aka Subbu aka Subhash is the youngest son of a family. He is a wastrel and gypsy and spends his days roaming around with girls, hanging around with his friends, and constantly failing his exams. Subbu's behavior always shows hatred and disgust towards his father, Viswanadh, who is a cafe owner. Subbu's elder brother, Chakri, on the other hand is a college level kickboxer and Viswanadh's favorite son. Chakri spends his days rigorously training for the inter college kickboxing championship, but ends up losing to his kickboxing arch rival, Rohit, who is from the elite Model College. While training, he and Rohit end up running into each other and Chakri always is shamed for his poor background as Chakri attends Government College. Jaanu aka Janaki is Subbu's neighbor and secretly in love in Subbu. Subbu is unaware that Jaanu is in love with him. Subbu usually considers Jaanu as a source of money and cars to impress girls and constantly borrows money and cars. Jaanu's father is a garage owner.

One day, Subbu meets Lovely, who is a rich college girl from the elite Model College, and lies that he attends the elite Engineering College and a wealthy man's son. Subbu is actually from the local government college just like his brother Chakri. Lovely falls for his lies and soon begins to express her love to Subbu. Eventually, she learns the truth and breaks up and insults Subbu in front of Viswanadh and Chakri. At the same time, Viswanadh finds out that Subbu has taken large amounts of Jaanu. Fatigued, he banishes Subbu.

Subbu is now homeless and gets support from Jaanu. Jaanu tells Subbu that he should be more responsible of himself and prove himself towards his father. He begins to reform himself and soon starts to understand the love of Jaanu. In the meantime, Chakri is attacked and seriously injured by Rohit, who now happens to be Lovely's new boyfriend and Subbu's enemy, and his friends causing Chakri to be hospitalized. This rules him out of the final match of the inter college kick boxing championship. Deciding to seek revenge for his brother's accident and redeem himself in front of Viswanadh's eyes, Subbu trains and works really hard to prepare for the inter college kickboxing championship. He defeats Rohit in the kickboxing match and wins the final intercollege kickboxing championship, dedicates the trophy to Chakri, redeems himself to Visnwanadh, and finally accepts Jaanu's love.

Cast

 Pawan Kalyan as Subramanyam / Subhash a.k.a Subbu
 Preeti Jhangiani as Janaki 'Janu'
 Aditi Gowitrikar as Lovely
 Bhupinder Singh as Rohit
 Achyuth as Chakri
 Brahmanandam as Telugu lecturer Avadhanalu
 Ali as Kondandarama Manoharan
 Kitty as Viswanadh
 Chandra Mohan as Kutumba Rao
 Vennira Aadai Moorthy as Lecturer
 Tanikella Bharani as Drunkard
 Mallikarjuna Rao as Malli
 Venu Madhav as Subbu's friend
 Varsha as Shanthi
 Ironleg Sastri as Malli's matchmaker
 Surya as Surya
 Dominic Chung as Chinese boy/Sparring partner
 Raghunatha Reddy

Soundtrack

Music composed by Ramana Gogula.

Reception
Deccan Herald wrote, "While the first half is full of fun-frolic situations, the second half of the movie brims with heart-wringing moments" but criticized the dubbing of film's actresses and called Ramana Gogula's score "Finger-snapping and peppy".

Box Office
The film has undergone the theatrical business of 4.5 crore and in its full run film has managed to collect a distributor share of over 9 crore and emerged as a Super Hit.

References

External links
 

1999 films
Indian action films
Telugu films remade in other languages
Indian boxing films
1990s Telugu-language films
Films directed by P. A. Arun Prasad
1999 action films
1990s sports films
Sports action films